see patent number # U.S. Patent No. 10,163,199 B2 for the Recirculating Aquaculture System and Treatment Method for Aquatic Species developed for the first commercially viable system for growing aquatic species indoors
A variable electro-precipitator (VEP) is a waste water remediation unit using electrocoagulation. The differences between a standard electrocoagulation (EC) unit and a variable Electro-precipitation unit are in the enhanced flow path and the unit electrode connections. The variable electro-precipitator's flow path has been designed to maximize retention time and to increase the turbulence of the water within the unit. This design aids in increasing the amount of effective treatment per gallon of water.

A major design weakness of the electrocoagulation units is the method used in connecting the electrode to the power source. These designs cause overheating, resulting in premature failure of the electrocoagulation reaction chamber. VEP reaction chambers are designed to resolve these performance issues by changing all electrode connections from the standard wet connection (inside the chamber) to an external dry connection. The VEP is cooler-operating, and has a longer chamber life than an electrocoagulation unit.

Water treatment